is a Japanese voice actress who is best known for her voice role as Ayumi Yoshida in Detective Conan. She was born in Chiba.

Roles

Anime

1995
Ping Pong Club - Junko Hoshino
Saint Tail - female student (ep 5); first year girl A (ep 11)

1996
Detective Conan - Ayumi Yoshida
Brave Command Dagwon - Woman

1997
Kindaichi Shounen no Jikenbo - Chie Hirashima/Keiko Horiguchi/Yuu Tokihara
Manmaru the Ninja Penguin - Harigawa

2001
The SoulTaker - Kasumi Shiina

2002
GetBackers - Kakei Sakura

2003
Mujin Wakusei Survive - Luna

2004
Ragnarok The Animation - Hana Tsukiyo
Tsuki wa Higashi ni Hi wa Nishi ni: Operation Sanctuary - Kyouko Nishina
Girls Bravo - Nanae-Kuh-Haruka

2005
Kotenkotenko - Bagworm

2006
Going Wild - Monta
Gift - eternal rainbow - Nami Rio
Kenichi: The Mightiest Disciple - Makoto Himeno

2008
Hakken Taiken Daisuki! Shimajirō - Rit-chan
Clannad After Story - Teacher (ep 23)

2011
Doraemon - Girl

External links

20th-century Japanese actresses
21st-century Japanese actresses
1972 births
Living people
Japanese video game actresses
Japanese voice actresses